Lee Woo Sing College is one of the new colleges of the Chinese University of Hong Kong. It was founded by university council in 2007 and admitted its first class of students in 2011.  The naming of the college is made possible by a HK$150 million donation and is named after entrepreneur Lee Woo Sing.

Site
It is located to the northwest of the existing United College.

Facilities
There are two buildings, North Block and Dorothy and Ti-Hua KOO Building (South Block). Facilities include a well equipped gym/fitness room, table tennis room, BBQ area, piano room, band room, cookery demonstration room, seminar rooms and multi-purpose theatres. The Catering Centre includes a food hall (WS Pavilion), a Shanghainese Restaurant (The Harmony) and a coffee shop (Café Tolo).

System
The arrangement will be similar to that of the four existing colleges in The Chinese University of Hong Kong, i.e. students can be either residents or non-residents. It is estimated that it will accommodate 600 of each.

References

External links

 Lee Woo Sing College
 Official College Facebook Page: Lee Woo Sing College CUHK 和聲書院

Chinese University of Hong Kong